Arthur Gibbs may refer to:
Arthur Gibbs (cricketer), English cricketer
Arthur Gibbs (footballer), Australian rules footballer